The Briton class  was a group of three wooden screw corvettes built for the Royal Navy in the late 1860s. All three ships of the class only served overseas during their brief service lives. Between them, they were assigned to the China, East Indies, African, North American, and the Pacific Stations. All three were regarded as obsolete 15 years after they were completed, and they were sold in 1886–87.

Design and description
The Briton-class corvettes were designed by Sir Edward Reed, the Director of Naval Construction, as lengthened versions of the  sloops. Like the smaller ships, they had a ram-style bow to reduce weight forward by elimination of the knee above the stem. Similarly, he shortened the counter at the stern to save weight.

The hull was built entirely from wood except for iron crossbeams. Their crew consisted of 220 officers and ratings.

Two different types of engines and boilers were used with this class. HMS Druid, the first ship completed, had a two-cylinder horizontal steam engine driving a single  propeller. In contrast, the two later ships had a two-cylinder horizontal compound expansion steam engine, driving a single 15-foot or  propeller. Briton and Thetis carried  of coal, while Druid carried an additional . Although no information is available on their range, Admiral G. A. Ballard estimated that Druid had only about two-thirds the range of her sisters, despite the additional coal that she carried, due to the greater efficiency of the compound expansion engines.

The lower masts were made of iron, but the other masts were wood. Ballard attributed their poor performance under sail to the drag of the propeller, which could neither be hoisted out of the water, nor feathered. He also attributed their sluggish steering under sail to interference with the flow of water to the rudder by the fixed propeller. The first two ships were re-rigged as barques after their first commission.

The first two ships were initially armed with a mix of 7-inch and 64-pounder 71 cwt rifled muzzle-loading guns. The eight 64-pounder guns were mounted on the broadside while the two  guns were mounted on the forecastle and poop as chase guns. It was credited with the nominal ability to penetrate  armour. After the completion of their first commissions, the two ships were rearmed with a total of fourteen lighter 64-cwt 64-pounder guns, two of which replaced the 7-inch guns as chase guns. Thetis, the last ship completed, was given this armament from the beginning.

Ships

Druid was the last ship to be built at Deptford Dockyard. The ship was initially assigned to the Cape of Good Hope Station, where she remained for two years before being transferred to the North America and West Indies Station. Druid was refitted upon her return home in December 1876, which included rearmament. The ship recommissioned in February 1879 and returned to the North American Station. She returned home in September 1882 and was paid off. Druid was laid up in the Medway until she was sold for scrap in 1886.

Briton was the first of the trio to be commissioned and was assigned to the East Indies Station in 1871. She remained there for four and a half years, mostly engaged on the suppression of the slave trade. The ship was refitted and rearmed upon her return home and Briton remained in reserve until recommissioned in 1881 for service on the Cape Station. She was transferred back to the East Indies after two years on the Cape. Her crew was relieved in 1884 by another sent out from Britain and the ship remained on station until she was sold, less her armament, in Bombay in 1887.

The construction of Thetis followed her sisters after a two-year delay and she was initially assigned to the China Station in 1873. She was transferred to the East Indies after a year on station and returned home in 1877 where she was refitted. Two years later, the ship was assigned to the Pacific Station until she was ordered home in 1883. Thetis was paid off after her arrival and was sold in 1887.

Notes

Footnotes

Bibliography

 

Corvettes of the Royal Navy
Victorian-era corvettes of the United Kingdom